Mark O'Connell may refer to:

 Mark O'Connell (bishop) (born 1964), American Roman Catholic bishop
 Mark O'Connell (musician), drummer and member of the band Taking Back Sunday
 Mark O'Connell (writer), Irish writer and author